Ezequiel Zamora Municipality may refer to the following places in the Venezuela:

Ezequiel Zamora Municipality, Barinas
Ezequiel Zamora Municipality, Cojedes
Ezequiel Zamora Municipality, Monagas

See also 
 Zamora (disambiguation)

Municipality name disambiguation pages